Blake Hutcheson (born 1962) is President and CEO of Oxford Properties Group Inc, a global real estate owner, developer, and property manager.

Born in Huntsville, Ontario, Blake was educated at Upper Canada College, before getting a BA in Political Science from University of Western Ontario. He then went on to the London School of Economics for an International Relations degree, and received his M.S. in real estate development from Columbia University.

Blake previously worked at CIBC and CB Richard Ellis, and has sat on numerous boards, including Ontario Premier Kathleen Wynne's transit investment strategy advisory panel.

References

1962 births
Businesspeople from Ontario
Canadian real estate businesspeople
Living people
Oxford Properties
People from Huntsville, Ontario